The 1804 United States presidential election in New Jersey took place between November 2 and December 5, 1804, as part of the 1804 United States presidential election. The state chose eight representatives, or electors to the Electoral College, who voted for President and Vice President.

During this election, New Jersey cast eight electoral votes for Democratic Republican incumbent Thomas Jefferson.

See also
 United States presidential elections in New Jersey

References

New Jersey
1804
1804 New Jersey elections